Richard D. Klausner is an American scientist who served as the 11th director of the National Cancer Institute of the United States.

Early life and education 
His father was a chemist, and Klausner would visit his father's laboratory as a child. He began studying physics at Yale University, but changed his focus to biology, with the plan of becoming a doctor in a rural area.
Klausner received his MD from Duke Medical School in 1976.

Career 
In 1979, Klausner joined the National Institutes of Health (NIH) as a postdoctoral fellow. At age 30, Klausner was appointed to the chief of the cell biology and metabolism branch of the National Institute of Child Health and Human Development.

In 1992, he directed the review of the NIH's intramural research programs, in which he recommended sweeping changes. He served as the director of the National Cancer Institute from 1995 to 2001, where he managed a staff of 5,000 employees and a budget of $4.5 billion. In total, he spent more than 20 years at the NIH.

He left the NCI to become the founding director of the Case Institute of Health, Science and Technology of the Case Foundation.

He was the managing partner of the biotech venture capital firm, the Column Group.
From 2002 to 2005, he was the executive director of the Bill & Melinda Gates Foundation.

He was a member of the Searle Scholars advisory board. He was a scientific advisor at the Fred Hutchinson Cancer Research Center. He has been an Advisor to the Presidents of the Academies for counter-terrorism and a liaison to the White House Office of Science & Technology Policy, and was the chief strategy advisor for USAID.

Klausner co-founded Juno Therapeutics in 2013, GRAIL in 2015. and MindStrong Health in 2014. He was the chief medical officer of Illumina from 2013 to 2016.

He was president of the American Society for Clinical Investigation from 1995 to 1996.

Research 
His research focused on T cells and the potential for CAR-T therapies. He also has published research on the genetics of Von Hippel–Lindau disease, a condition which predisposes a person to developing cancer. He is an author of more than 300 scientific articles.

Personal life 
Klausner has two sons and twin daughters.

Awards 
 1986 Elected to the American Society for Clinical Investigation (ASCI)
 1993 Elected to the National Academy of Sciences
 1995 Elected to the American Academy of Arts and Sciences
 1997 Dickson Prize in Medicine, University of Pittsburgh
 1998 Raymond Bourgine Award for Excellence in Cancer Research and Gold Medal of Paris
 1999 ASCI Stanley J. Korsmeyer Award
 2000 Medal of Honour, International Agency for Research on Cancer
 2018 Elected fellow of the American Association for Cancer Research

References

External links 
 NCI in the Post-Klausner Era
 

American oncologists
Duke University School of Medicine alumni
Fellows of the American Academy of Arts and Sciences
Living people
1950s births
National Institutes of Health faculty
Members of the United States National Academy of Sciences
Members of the National Academy of Medicine
Fred Hutchinson Cancer Research Center people